Lavergne may refer to:

People
Armand Lavergne (1880–1935), Canadian politician and lawyer
Célia de Lavergne (born 1979), French politician
Chris Lavergne, American media strategist and businessperson
Didier Lavergne, French make-up artist
Gary Lavergne (born 1955), American author
Gerard Lavergne (born 1999), Dominican footballer
Gordon Lavergne (1910–1970), Canadian politician
Joseph Lavergne (1847–1922), Canadian politician
Louis Lavergne (1845–1931), Canadian politician
Pascal Lavergne (born 1967), French politician
Régis Lavergne (born 1974), French tennis player

Places

Canada
Lavergne River, a river of Quebec

France
Lavergne, Lot, a commune in the Lot department
Lavergne, Lot-et-Garonne, a commune in the Lot-et-Garonne department

See also 
La Vergne (disambiguation)